Issa Abdul-Hadi Al-Batran was one of the leaders of Al-Qassam Brigades, Hamas' armed wing. He was killed by Israeli airstrike on July 30, 2010 at the Nuseirat refugee camp in the central Gaza Strip. The Israeli army said that the targets were 'terror infrastructure' in Gaza. His second wife reported that he went knowingly to his death, since he was incapable of overcoming his mourning for the loss of his first wife Manal Sha’rawi, and their five children: Bilal, Izz Ad-Din, Ihsan, Islam and Eyman, who had been wiped out in an earlier attempt to kill him, when an Israeli shell struck their balcony in Al-Bureij refugee camp on 26 January 2009.

References

2010 deaths
Hamas members
Year of birth missing
Deaths by Israeli airstrikes